Santa's Workshop is a Disney short film directed by Wilfred Jackson, first released on December 10, 1932 in the Silly Symphonies series. The film features Santa Claus and his elves preparing for Christmas in Santa's workshop.  A sequel, The Night Before Christmas, partially based on the 1823 poem "A Visit from St. Nicholas", was made the year after, portraying Santa leaving the toys in a house with nine children.

In Sweden and Norway, Santa's Workshop is part of the Christmas television special From All of Us to All of You, traditionally shown on Christmas Eve. At the initiative of Disney, scenes depicting various ethnic stereotypes such as a pickaninny doll and a Jewish doll have been cut out of the film, which has given rise to a lot of public criticism in Sweden and in Denmark.

Santa's Workshop is the first "Silly Symphonies" titled cartoon to develop with RCA's Photophone synchronization early-in-film sound system.

The short features the first of the Marches Militaires by Franz Schubert.

Plot summary 
As Santa flips through his book containing the names of every boy and girl in the world, he realizes that little Emily has a blank space next to her name. This means he didn't receive a letter from her last year and in turn, Emily didn't receive any toys. It's up to Santa and his elves to make Emily's Christmas twice as nice this year. Some elves are cleaning Santa's Sleigh and reindeer while singing, preparing for the sleigh ride on Christmas Eve. Santa's little helpers hurry to finish the toys, which come to life and march into Santa’s bag, so he can embark on his journey around the globe.

Voice cast
 Santa Claus: Walter Geiger
 Deep-voice gnome: Jesse Delos Jewkes
 Santa's secretary: Pinto Colvig
 Santa's second helper: Walt Disney

Home media
The short was featured on early VHS releases of A Walt Disney Christmas, which featured the uncut scene with the blackface doll.

The short was released on DVD on December 19, 2006, on Walt Disney Treasures: More Silly Symphonies, Volume Two in the "From the Vault" section, because of the blackface doll.

The short was remastered in HD and released on Disney+ on November 12, 2019, with the blackface doll scene removed.  It was originally claimed by Disney+ that the short was presented as originally released, but this claim has since been removed from the streaming service.

See also 
 List of Christmas films
 Santa Claus in film

References

External links 
 
 Santa's Workshop at disneyshorts.org
 

1932 short films
1930s color films
1932 animated films
1932 films
American Christmas films
Animated Christmas films
1930s Disney animated short films
Films directed by Wilfred Jackson
Films produced by Walt Disney
Film controversies
Disney controversies
Santa Claus in film
Silly Symphonies
Films about elves
Films scored by Frank Churchill
American black-and-white films
1930s Christmas films
African-American-related controversies in film
Race-related controversies in animation
Race-related controversies in film
Censored films
1930s American films